Colin Leslie Westerbeck Jr. is a curator, writer, and teacher of the history of photography.

Before moving to Los Angeles, where he has taught at UCLA and USC, he was curator of photography at the Art Institute of Chicago.  He is a regular contributor to publications such as the Los Angeles Times and West Magazine. Before he began writing on photography, he was a film critic for Commonweal.

Awards
Reva and David Logan Prize for New Writing on Photography.
Art Critic's Fellowship from the National Endowment for the Arts.
Received a grant, along with Joel Meyerowitz, from the National Endowment for the Humanities for research on the history of street photography.
2000: J. Dudley Johnston Award from the Royal Photographic Society for the writing of photographic criticism and history.

Publications

References

External links
Westerbeck interview with Irit Krygier, 2009
Westerbeck's articles on photography

Year of birth missing (living people)
Living people
American art curators
American art historians
American newspaper reporters and correspondents
Photography curators
Photography academics
University of California, Los Angeles faculty
University of Southern California faculty
Los Angeles Times people
Place of birth missing (living people)
Historians from California